"Go Getta" is the second single from Def Jam artist Young Jeezy off his second album The Inspiration, it features singer R. Kelly. The song samples "Born On Halloween" by Blue Magic. It was released in late January. This song was #76 on Rolling Stones list of the 100 Best Songs of 2007.

The making of the video (directed by Chris Robinson) was featured on BET's Access Granted on February 7, 2007. The Runners, Young Buck, and Slick Pulla made cameos in the video.

Remixes
The official remix appears on the mixtape Young Jeezy Presents USDA: Cold Summer, featuring R. Kelly, Bun B, & Jadakiss. The remix is produced by Drumma Boy.

Several freestyles were also made by Lil Wayne ("N.O. Nigga") and Chamillionaire ("Mo Scrilla").

In popular culture
This song was New York Yankees all-star shortstop Derek Jeter's entrance music for the entire 2007 season.
This song was used in the 2007 film This Christmas.
This song is also the entrance music for MLB all-star outfielder Ryan Braun of the Milwaukee Brewers
This song was used as the entrance music for C.B. Dollaway at UFC 110.

Charts

Weekly charts

Year-end charts

Certifications

Notes

2007 singles
Jeezy songs
Music videos directed by Chris Robinson (director)
R. Kelly songs
Songs written by R. Kelly
Songs written by Kevin Cossom
Songs written by Jeezy
2006 songs
Def Jam Recordings singles
Songs written by Allan Felder
Song recordings produced by the Runners
Songs written by Andrew Harr
Songs written by Norman Harris (musician)